Lewis Henry Moore (September 12, 1904 Hinton, Oklahoma – March 25, 1956 Atlanta, Georgia) was an American racecar driver. He was most known during his racing career for qualifying on the pole position of the 1932 Indianapolis 500. He was later remembered as a five-time Indianapolis 500 winning owner, a record which stood until 1987.

Early life and driving
He was born in Oklahoma on September 12, 1904. He moved with his family to California at a young age. He started his career on the dirt tracks of California in 1923. In 1926, he won 18 feature races out of 23 starts and had been in the lead of the other 5 when equipment failed. He drove in the Indianapolis 500 from 1928 to 1936. He finished second in 1928, started on the pole in 1932, and finished 3rd in 1933 and 1934. He also drove in the 1934 Tripoli Grand Prix, starting 10th and finishing 7th.

Racing ownership
After his driving career ended in 1936, Moore became a competitive car owner. Moore-owned entries won the Indianapolis 500 five times: in 1938, 1941, 1947, 1948, and 1949. The final three from 1947-1949 was the first of to-date two occasions to see three consecutive victories by an owner. Drivers of Moore-owned cars included Mauri Rose, Bill Holland, Floyd Roberts, Tony Bettenhausen, Floyd Davis, Lee Wallard, George Connor and Cliff Bergere. Moore earned a reputation as a hard-nosed team owner who expected his drivers to follow orders. In 1949, Bill Holland led comfortably in one of the Blue Crown cars while Mauri Rose, in the other team car, gradually raised the race pace in preparation for a late-race challenge. Car owner Moore recognized what was happening and hung out the "HOLD POS" sign. Holland complied and eased off, but Rose ignored the signal, and with just 8 laps to go, broke a magneto strap and retired. Holland cruised to an easy win and when Rose arrived back at the pits, Moore fired him on the spot.

Following racing
Moore retired from racing as an owner in 1953 following the on-track death of his friend, Chet Miller. In September 1955, Moore was put in charge of Pontiac's racing division. On 25 March 1956, Moore was taken to the hospital after complaining of a massive headache. He was pronounced dead shortly thereafter due to a brain hemorrhage.

Indianapolis 500 results

References

External links

Champ Car Stats profile

Indianapolis 500 drivers
Indianapolis 500 polesitters
1904 births
1956 deaths
People from Caddo County, Oklahoma
Racing drivers from Oklahoma
AAA Championship Car drivers